The Field of Streams is a patch of sky where several stellar streams are visible and crisscross.

It was discovered by Vasily Belokurov and Daniel Zucker's team in 2006 by analyzing the Sloan Digital Sky Survey II (SDSS-II) data. The team named the area Field of Streams because of so many crisscrossing trails of stars.

The Sagittarius Stream of the Sagittarius Dwarf Elliptical Galaxy (SagDEG) dominates the Field. It has a split trail within the area of the Field of Streams, because SagDEG has wrapped around the Milky Way Galaxy multiple times, which has resulted in overlapping trails. The forking of the trail has made it possible to infer the organization of dark matter in the inner halo of the Milky Way Galaxy, resulting in the determination that it is distributed in a round spherical manner, as opposed to the expected flattened spheroid. The shape of the streams also implies that the dark matter is very cold, due to the thin trails, and persisting existence.

Also appearing in the Field is the Monoceros Ring, which was discovered before the Field.

See also
 Stellar stream
 List of stellar streams

References

Sources 
 The Astrophysical Journal, Volume 658, Issue 1, pp. 337–344. "An Orphan in the Field of Streams"; 2007 March; Belokurov, V. et al.; ; ; 
 The Astrophysical Journal, Volume 642, Issue 2, pp. L137-L140. "The Field of Streams: Sagittarius and Its Siblings"; 2006 May; Belokurov, V. et al.; ; ; 
 Monthly Notices of the Royal Astronomical Society, Volume 375 Issue 4, pp. 1171–1179. "Is Ursa Major II the progenitor of the Orphan Stream?"; M. Fellhauer et al.; ; 
 Science News, "Galactic de Gustibus: Milky Way's snacks shed light on dark matter and galaxy growth", Ron Cowen, 2006 July 1
 Christian Science Monitor, "Big galaxies, it seems, eat little ones", Robert C. Cowen, 2006 May 18 (accessed 2009 March 29)
 New Scientist, "Our galaxy's halo is round not squashed", Maggie McKee, 2006 May 9 (accessed 2009 March 29)

Milky Way
Stellar streams
Sky regions
Astronomical objects discovered in 2006